Lock's Quest is a real-time strategy tower defense video game developed by 5th Cell and published by THQ. It is 5th Cell's second Nintendo DS game. It was released in North America on September 8, 2008, in Europe on September 26, 2008 and in Australia on September 25, 2008.

On January 6, 2017, the German game ratings board Unterhaltungssoftware Selbstkontrolle (USK) rated Lock's Quest for PlayStation 4, Xbox One, and PC which indicated that the publisher was developing a port for the game. and on 16 February 2017, THQ Nordic officially announced that they were developing a remaster for Lock's Quest scheduled for May 2017 for PlayStation 4, Xbox One and PC with development by Digital Continue.

Gameplay
Lock's Quest is a real-time strategy game, incorporating tower defense gameplay elements. The battlefield, viewed from an isometric perspective, is displayed on the DS's bottom screen.  Combat is divided into two phases, Build and Battle.  During the Build phase, the player has a limited amount of time and resources to construct defenses, which consist of walls, towers, cannons, machines, and traps.  Once the Build phase ends, the Battle phase begins.

Plot
The game is set in a kingdom, built using a mysterious substance known as Source. The builders of this kingdom, the Archineers, studied source in an attempt to better understand its properties. The greatest archineer was Agonius, who discovered a truly remarkable property of source - that it can emulate life. Agonius started creating lifelike beings from the source, but the King, who understood the dangers of this, demanded that Agonius halt his work. Agonius refused, and so was banished from the kingdom.

Seeking vengeance upon the King, Agonius assumed the mantle of Lord Agony and created a clockwork army with the intent of destroying the kingdom. A war ensued, with heavy casualties on both sides. Eventually, two kingdom archineers, Kenan and Jacob, infiltrated Agony's fortress. The exact nature of the events that happened therein are not revealed until the end of the game - all that is known, at first, is that Agony was defeated, and Jacob was missing, presumed dead. Kenan, now a hero, took up the position of Chief Archineer.

The game itself begins some years after the events above. Lock is a young man living in a coastal village, along with his sister, Emi, and grandfather, Tobias. When this village (and indeed the entire kingdom) is attacked by a new army of clockworks, under a new Lord Agony, Lock enlists as an archineer and helps to fight the clockworks. After a long time, the Kingdom force prevails and the new Agony is defeated.
At the climax of the plot, it is revealed that the new Lord Agony is none other than Jacob. Long ago, when Jacob reached Agonius' chamber, he found Agonius a frail and broken man. He also found the young Lock, who was himself clockwork, the greatest creation of Agonius. Jacob took Lock and raised him as a human, under the guise of Tobias. He created Emi, who is also clockwork, and the village in which Lock was raised.

At the end of the game, the King tells Lock that, despite being clockwork, he was truly alive, because Agonius had given Lock his soul. Conversely, Jacob could not bring himself to sacrifice his soul in order to give Emi true life, and so, in time, Emi would simply crumble to dust.

However, it is implied that Jacob, repentant and sorrowful for having waged war on the Kingdom, did eventually do so at Lock's request, and the final scene of the game is Lock and Emi playing tag on the beach.

Development
THQ announced the development of Lock's Quest on April 1, 2008 in a press release. In a preview of the game on April 2, 2008, IGN wrote of their experience of the game, "We're still early on in Lock's Quest, but it has the potential to be one of the top strategy games on DS before all is said and done." In July, at the San Diego Comic Convention, THQ debuted a promotional mini-comic based on the universe of the game entitled Lock's Quest: A Source of Hope - Volume 1 drawn by Edison Yan. IGN awarded Lock's Quest its "Best Strategy Game" award for the Nintendo DS at E3 2008.

Reception 

Lock's Quest was well received by most critics. IGN praised most aspects of the game, writing, "Lock's Quest is by far one of the most original, inspired, and entertaining experiences we've had on DS this year.", receiving an Editors' Choice Award and DS Game of the Month for September. 1UP.com criticized the un-skippable cut scenes, but said it "succeeds as both a love letter to, and an evolution of, the tower-defense genre." Nintendo World Report said Lock's Quest was "just a few design tweaks away from being a fantastic game.", claiming that it is "definitely disappointing in light of all its great assets and originality." GameZone called it "unique" and "perfectly suited for the DS". GameDaily praised the story, gameplay, graphics and music, and called it "an excellent game." GameSpot praised the "lengthy single-player campaign, exciting multiplayer, and addictive gameplay." Eurogamer criticized the battle phase of combat and the enemy artificial intelligence, while praising the "excellent graphics and repetitive but gripping gameplay." It was a nominee for two Nintendo DS-specific awards from IGN for their 2008 video game awards, including Best Strategy Game and Best New IP. GameSpot nominated it for Best Game No One Played.

References

External links
 

2008 video games
5th Cell games
Fantasy video games
Linux games
MacOS games
Nintendo DS games
PlayStation 4 games
Real-time strategy video games
THQ games
THQ Nordic games
Tower defense video games
Video games developed in the United States
Video games with isometric graphics
Windows games
Xbox One games